Eulimella fontanae is a species of sea snail, a marine gastropod mollusk in the family Pyramidellidae, the pyrams and their allies.

The epithet "fontanae" refers to Mrs M.A. Fontana Angioy, editor of the journal La Conchiglia.

Description
This species is similar to Eulimella cerullii (Cossmann, 1916). The size of the slender, conical shell varies between 3.5 mm and 4.3 mm. The teleoconch  contains six to seven rather flat whorls with a deep suture between them. The growth lines, shaped like an inverted S,  are at about right angles to the growth direction. The aperture is oval. The shell lacks an umbilicus and has a noticeable fold on the columella.

Distribution
The species occurs in the Atlantic Ocean off the Azores at depths between 400 m and 620 m.

References

External links
 To CLEMAM
 To Encyclopedia of Life
 To World Register of Marine Species

fontanae
Molluscs of the Azores
Gastropods described in 2000